Andris Jesús Herrera Salgado (born 20 October 1996) is a Venezuelan professional footballer who plays as a Second striker for Prva HNL club Varaždin.

Club career

Varaždin
In February 2021, he signed for Croatian club Varaždin on a free transfer. In his second season at the club, they won the league and returned to the top flight.

Career statistics

Club

Honours
Caracas
Copa Venezuela: 2013
Varaždin
Druga HNL: 2021–22

References

1996 births
Living people
Footballers from Caracas
Venezuelan footballers
Association football forwards
NK Varaždin (2012) players
Caracas FC players
Yaracuyanos FC players
Portuguesa F.C. players
Estudiantes de Mérida players
First Football League (Croatia) players
Croatian Football League players
Venezuelan Primera División players